Windeweer is a former municipality in the Dutch province of Groningen. It existed until 1821, when it was merged with Hoogezand. Since 2018, it is part of Midden-Groningen. Windeweer is the southern part of the village.

References

Former municipalities of Groningen (province)
Midden-Groningen